Chicoreus cloveri is a species of sea snail, a marine gastropod mollusk in the family Muricidae, the murex snails or rock snails.

Distribution
This marine species occurs in the Indian Ocean off Mauritius.

References

External links
 MNHN,Paris: holotype
 Houart, R., 1985. Report on Muricidae (Gastropoda) recently dredged in the south-western Indian Ocean-I. Description of eight new species. Venus 44(3): 159-171

Muricidae
Gastropods described in 1985